Steve Whittingham (born 4 February 1962) is an English footballer, who played as a forward in the Football League for Tranmere Rovers. Has two children

References

Tranmere Rovers F.C. players
Southport F.C. players
Association football forwards
English Football League players
1962 births
Living people
People from Wallasey
English footballers